Lists of animated feature films released in the 2000s organized by year of release:
List of animated feature films of 2000
List of animated feature films of 2001
List of animated feature films of 2002
List of animated feature films of 2003
List of animated feature films of 2004
List of animated feature films of 2005
List of animated feature films of 2006
List of animated feature films of 2007
List of animated feature films of 2008
List of animated feature films of 2009

See also
List of highest-grossing animated films of the 2000s

2000s
Animated